The Sandsea Kill flows into the Mohawk River in Pattersonville, New York.

References 

Rivers of New York (state)
Rivers of Schenectady County, New York
Mohawk River